The Scout and Guide movement in Albania is served by
 Girl Scouts of Albania (Vajzat Udhëheqëse të Shqipërisë), member of the World Association of Girl Guides and Girl Scouts
 Beslidhja Skaut Albania, former member of the World Organization of the Scout Movement (2005 to 2014)
 Shoqata Skaut Shqipëtarë, spin-off of Beslidhja Skaut Albania

The following organizations are defunct or their current status is unknown:
 Besa Skaut Albania, former member of WOSM (2002 to 2005) and original organization from which Beslidhja Skaut Albania spun off
 Shoqata e Guidave dhe Skoutëve në Shqipëri, formerly working towards membership in the World Association of Girl Guides and Girl Scouts
 Udhëhequset dhe Skautistet e Europes with contacts to the Union Internationale des Guides et Scouts d'Europe

References

See also

 Scouting and Guiding in Kosovo